Kaiserdamm is a boulevard in the Westend and Charlottenburg districts of Berlin, Germany.

Route
It forms a westward continuation of Bismarckstraße, Straße des 17. Juni and the Unter den Linden boulevard.

History
Originally an unpaved track, the road was inaugurated at the behest of Wilhelm II (after whom it is named), and opened to traffic in 1906.  The road was rebuilt in 1939 as part of the East-West Axis of the planned Welthauptstadt Germania, and much of the road as it is today dates from this time.

Buildings
Kaiserdamm is served by the Kaiserdamm U-Bahn station positioned halfway between the Theodor-Heuss-Platz U-Bahn station and Sophie-Charlotte-Platz U-Bahn stations.

Prominent buildings on the road include the studios of Rundfunk Berlin-Brandenburg at the corner of Theodor-Heuss-Platz and the former police headquarters with the address Kaiserdamm 1.

External links

Streets in Berlin
Charlottenburg-Wilmersdorf